Maria Bodøgaard (born 27 March 1983) is a Norwegian television presenter on The Voice TV Norway.  She hosts the show Planet Voice every day.

She was born in Bodø.

References

1983 births
Living people
Norwegian television presenters
Norwegian women television presenters
People from Bodø